Mark William "Beer Man" Johnson (born May 22, 1954) is an American professional golfer who plays on the Champions Tour.

Johnson was born in Barstow, California. He decided to forgo college and turned pro directly out of high school in 1972; he played on mini-tours around Southern California for two years, a decision which he regrets. Unable to support himself financially, Johnson regained his amateur status and for the next 18 years earned a living driving a Budweiser truck while continuing to hone his skills in amateur tournaments.

In 1998, at the age of 45, Johnson parked his beer truck and regained his professional status. With the sponsorship of his long-time employer, H Olson Distributing of Barstow, and a handful of local businessmen, Johnson played five years on the Canadian Tour and a year on the Nationwide Tour to prepare for the Champions Tour, which he joined after reaching the age of 50 in May 2004.

Johnson won his first Champions Tour event at the 2005 Toshiba Senior Classic in his 14th start. He won in spectacular fashion holing out an 89-yard wedge shot for an eagle at the 510 yard par-5 18th hole.

Johnson's status as a former beer truck driver has earned him somewhat of a cult following from Champions Tour galleries. It is not uncommon to hear someone shout, "Way to Go Beer Man" during rounds. Johnson embraces the Beer Man persona, and has even named his personal website beermangolf.com. He lives in Helendale, California.

Amateur wins (9)
1972 (1) CIF Championship (individual event)
1989 (1) SCGA Mid-Amateur
1990 (1) SCGA Tournament of Club Champions
1993 (1) SCGA Mid-Amateur
1994 (2) SCGA Mid-Amateur, Pacific Coast Amateur
1996 (2) California State Amateur, SCGA Tournament of Club Champions
1997 (1) SCGA Tournament of Club Champions

Professional wins (1)

Champions Tour wins (1)

References

External links

American male golfers
PGA Tour golfers
PGA Tour Champions golfers
Golfers from California
People from Barstow, California
Sportspeople from San Bernardino County, California

1954 births
Living people